Laura Michelle Joyce (born 4 October 1983) is an English former cricketer who played as a wicket-keeper and right-handed batter. She appeared in three One Day Internationals for England in August 2001, making her debut against Scotland. She batted twice, making 27 runs, and took one catch. She played county cricket for Middlesex from 1998 to 2000 and Surrey from 2002 to 2008. She had a brief stint with Western Australia in the 2006–07 Women's National Cricket League.

References

External links
 
 

1983 births
Living people
People from the London Borough of Islington
England women One Day International cricketers
Middlesex women cricketers
Surrey women cricketers
Western Australia women cricketers
Wicket-keepers